On 15 October 2011 about 200,000 people gathered in Rome, Italy to protest against economic inequality and the influence of the European Commission, the  European Central Bank, the International Monetary Fund on politics and also against the government of Silvio Berlusconi. The protests began in solidarity with the Spanish protests. Many other protests occurred in other Italian cities the same day.

Movements involved
The demonstrations were endorsed by several political parties, trade unions and civil movements, including: Cobas, Federazione Anarchica Italiana, Youth Federation of Italian Communists, Young Communists, Purple people, Workers' Communist Party, Party of Italian Communists, Communist Refoundation Party, Left Ecology Freedom, Critical Left, the left wing of the Italian General Confederation of Labour, and many others.

Riots
On the afternoon the Rome protests turned violent, as hundreds of hooded protesters arrived on the scene and broke away from the otherwise peaceful demonstration, setting cars and a police van on fire, smashing bank windows and clashed with police. A Catholic church was ransacked and a statue of the Madonna was thrown into the street where it was stomped on by one of the rioters. Two news crews from Sky Italia were also assaulted. Police repeatedly fired tear gas and water cannons at the protesters. At least 135 people were injured, including 105 police officers. Twelve people were arrested the same day, and another one on 17 October.

It was later determined that the damage from the rioting amounted to €1.815 million, with €1 million tied to the Public Works Department.

References

See also

15 October 2011 global protests
2010–2011 Greek protests
2011 Chilean protests
2011 Israeli middle class protests
2011 Spanish protests (Spanish 15M Indignants movement)
2011 United Kingdom anti-austerity protests
Iceland Kitchenware Revolution
List of global Occupy movement protest locations
List of protests in the 21st century
Lobbying
Occupy movement
Occupy Wall Street
Plutocracy
Protests of 1968

2011 in Italy
2011 riots
2011 in international relations
Demonstration, 2011
Protests in Italy
Anti-austerity protests in the European Union
2011 protests
Occupy movement
October 2011 events in Italy